The Ringamålako is an endangered Swedish breed of dairy cattle. It is named for the village of Ringamåla in the southern Swedish county of Blekinge, and is found primarily in southern Sweden. It is similar to the type of Swedish Red-and-White cattle of the 1940s, and is considered a valuable genetic resource.

History 

The Ringamålako is a traditional domestic Swedish breed. It is thought to be similar to the type of Swedish Red-and-White ( or SRB) cattle that was raised in the 1940s. Like the Swedish Red-and-White, it derives from the former Swedish Red Pied and Swedish Ayrshire breeds. The Ringamålako population was isolated from other dairy breeds for many years, and is considered to be a valuable genetic resource. There is a programme of recovery and conservation of the breed. The Ringamålako herd-book was established in 1993.

The Ringamålako is grouped with two other endangered indigenous cattle breeds, the Väneko and the Bohuskulla, as Allmogekor, or roughly "Swedish native cattle". Conservation and registration of these populations is managed by a society, the Föreningen Allmogekon.

In 2014 the total Ringamålako population was reported to be 164.

Characteristics 

The coat of the Ringamålako is multi-coloured red and white.

Use 

The Ringamålako is a dual-purpose breed, kept both for its milk and for its meat; it is, however, not very productive. The only breeding aim is preservation of the breed without contamination from other breeds. It is maintained as a genetic resource for the Swedish Red-and-White, and for social and cultural reasons. It may be used in vegetation management.

References

Cattle breeds originating in Sweden
Agriculture in Sweden
Cattle breeds